Matheus Pires Machado (born 9 July 2001) is a Brazilian footballer who plays as a midfielder for Montrose in Scottish League One.

Career
Machado began his career with Red Bull Brasil, before signing for Scottish club Inverness Caledonian Thistle in August 2018. He was included in a first-team squad for the first time in March 2019, and made his debut in the 2019–20 season, coming on late in a 3-1 loss to Partick Thistle.

He was released by the club in June 2020 when his contract expired. He subsequently joined Portugal's Primera Liga side, Rio Ave on 1 July 2020.

Machado returned to Scottish football in August 2021, signing for Elgin City. He made his debut for Elgin in a 2–0 away loss to Edinburgh City after being substituted on in the final 20 minutes.

On 9 August 2022, Machado left Elgin and joined Highland Football League side Rothes.

On 31 January 2023, Machado was signed by League One side, Montrose.

Career statistics

Club

References

2001 births
Living people
Brazilian footballers
Association football midfielders
Red Bull Brasil players
Inverness Caledonian Thistle F.C. players
Scottish Professional Football League players
Brazilian expatriate footballers
Brazilian expatriate sportspeople in Scotland
Expatriate footballers in Scotland
Sociedade Esportiva Palmeiras players
Rio Ave F.C. players
Elgin City F.C. players
Footballers from São Paulo
Rothes F.C. players
Montrose F.C. players